Choi Sook- (also Choi Sug-i, ; born 17 February 1980 in Incheon) is a South Korean judoka, who competed in the women's heavyweight category. She picked up a total of fifteen medals in her career, including a silver from the 2002 Asian Games in Busan, and also finished seventh in the over-78 kg division at the 2004 Summer Olympics.

Choi first appeared in the international scene as part of the host nation's squad at the 2002 Asian Games in Busan, where she picked up a silver medal in the over-78 kg division, losing the final match by a waza-ari point to China's Sun Fuming.

At the 2004 Summer Olympics in Athens, Choi qualified for the South Korean squad in the women's heavyweight class (+78 kg), by placing third and receiving a berth from the Asian Championships in Almaty, Kazakhstan. She lost her opening match to Russia's Tea Donguzashvili, who successfully scored an ippon and threw her into the tatami with an obi otoshi (belt drop) nearly twenty seconds before the two-minute mark. In the repechage, Choi redeemed her strength to easily tap Egypt's Samah Ramadan out of the mat with an ippon seoi nage (one-arm shoulder throw) and then earned two yuko points to thwart Italy's Barbara Andolina. Choi's chances of an Olympic bronze medal diminished, as she succumbed to an ippon and a tani otoshi throw from Ukraine's Maryna Prokofyeva in the third round of the draft, relegating Choi to the seventh position.

References

External links
 
 
 

1980 births
Living people
Olympic judoka of South Korea
Judoka at the 2004 Summer Olympics
Judoka at the 2002 Asian Games
Asian Games medalists in judo
Sportspeople from Incheon
South Korean female judoka
Asian Games silver medalists for South Korea
Medalists at the 2002 Asian Games
20th-century South Korean women
21st-century South Korean women